is a Japanese politician who serves as mayor of Yokosuka, Kanagawa from 10 July 2009.

Early life 
After graduating from Yokosuka High School in 1994 and Waseda University in 1999, Yoshida worked at Accenture for two years and then studied political science at graduate school.

Political career 
In 2003, Yoshida ran for Yokosuka's assembly election, in which he was the youngest candidate and won the most votes. He was reelected in 2007, gaining more votes than any other candidate again.

In the mayoral election held on 28 June 2009, Yoshida beat Ryōichi Kabaya, a former government official and the incumbent mayor backed by former Prime Minister Junichirō Koizumi and three major political parties. His victory, making him the first mayor of Yokosuka who has no bureaucratic background since 1973, is seen as a blow to the prospects for Shinjirō Koizumi, Junichirō Koizumi's second son, who plans to run for the coming national election.

References

External links 
 Official website 

1975 births
Living people
Accenture people
Mayors of places in Kanagawa Prefecture
People from Yokosuka, Kanagawa
Waseda University alumni
21st-century Japanese politicians